Miloje Miletić (born 1953) is the former Chief of the General Staff of the Serbian Armed Forces, appointed 15 February 2009. Before that, he served as acting Deputy Chief of the General Staff. He retired from active service on 12 December 2011.

Education
 School of National Defence, 2000
 Staff Command College, 1995
 Military Academy, Artillery, 1976

Commands held
 Deputy Chief of SAF GS
 Chief of the Development Department(Ј-5), SAF GS
 Chief of the Training Department (Ј-7), SAF GS
 Chief of the Artillery Department, Field Army Sector, SAF GS
 Deputy Chief of the Artillery Department, Army Sector, SAF GS
 Chief of the Artillery Department, Field Army Sector, SAF GS
 Command posts ranging from the platoon commander to the commanding officer of motorized and artillery brigade

Personal life
Miletić is married and has two children.

References

Chiefs of the Serbian General Staff
1953 births

Living people